Hanshin University is a private university in the Seoul National Capital Area of South Korea. Established in 1939, it is affiliated with the Presbyterian Church in the Republic of Korea, one of the most progressive Protestant churches in South Korea. Hanshin University was formerly a theological seminary and became a university in 1980. It currently offers undergraduate and post-graduate degree programs as well as modules for continuing education.

Notable people
Kang, Won-yong Pastor, Theologian, Activist
Ham, Tae-young Former Vice President of the Republic of Korea 
Moon, Ik-hwan Pastor, Poet, Activist
Chang, Chun-ha Activist, Politician, Journalist

See also
List of colleges and universities in South Korea
Education in South Korea

References

External links

Universities and colleges in Gyeonggi Province